The European Rally Championship (officially FIA European Rally Championship) is an automobile rally competition held annually on the European continent and organized by the Fédération Internationale de l'Automobile (FIA).
The championship has been organized since 1953 and has competed in different European countries, alternating between rallies on asphalt and gravel. It was the first supranational rally championship that was organized in the world and therefore the oldest one. In 2012 it had 60 editions and in 2013 it was renewed with the merger with the Intercontinental Rally Challenge.

History

The European Rally Championship was first contested in 1953 and in the following year was one of the most prestigious rallying series. However, with the introduction of the World Rally Championship for manufacturers in 1973, and in particular with the drivers' World Championship being contested from 1979 on, the importance of the ERC began to decline.

Over many years, a typical ERC season featured around 40 rallies, and from 1974 on, the rallies were assigned different coefficients (1, 2, 3 or 4) that were multiplied with the championship points. Changing the coefficients to 2, 5, 10 and 20 did also not improve the situation. Thus, the ERC was more a series for event organizers than an interesting championship for drivers.

A first improvement was implemented for the 2004 season, where the number of events counting for the European Rally Championship were reduced to those with coefficient 20, while the other rallies became part of regional "European Rally Cups". An ERC season now featured around 10 to 12 events and thus had a clearer structure.

Between 2007 and 2011, the driver had to register for the European championships and thus only registered drivers could score ERC points, keeping the local drivers from taking up all ERC points despite not participating in the championship. The registered drivers were also obligated to contest a minimal number of events.

Between 2013 and 2021, French-based broadcaster Eurosport was the  promoter of ERC. From 2022, it was taken over by Munich based WRC Promoter GmbH.

Recent seasons

2010 season

The 2010 ERC season featured 11 rallies. Luca Rossetti was the winner of 4 events and won the championship.

2011 season

The 2011 ERC season started on 14 April 2011 and featured 11 rallies. It ended on 29 October with the Rallye International du Valais. Italian driver Luca Rossetti claimed his third European championship title after winning 5 of the events. In total, 28 registered drivers from 7 different countries competed in the championship.

2012 season

The 2012 season started in January with a new event, the "Jänner Rallye" in Austria. As an important change, drivers no longer had to register for the championship. Finnish driver Juho Hänninen won the championship.

2013 season

The 2013 season is the first after the merger between IRC and the old ERC, and also the first after Eurosport became the championship's promoter. The season started with the Jänner Rallye in Austria on 3 January 2013, and ended with the Rallye du Valais on 9 November. Czech driver Jan Kopecký won the championship.

2014 season

The 2014 season started with the Jänner Rallye in Austria on 3 January 2014, and ended with the Tour de Corse on 8 November. Finnish driver Esapekka Lappi won the championship and the new Asphalt Masters trophy, while Polish drivers Robert Kubica and Kajetan Kajetanowicz won the Ice Masters and Gravel Masters, respectively. French driver Stéphane Lefebvre won the ERC Junior championship.

2015 season

The season started with the Jänner Rallye in Austria on 4 January 2015, and ended with the Rallye International du Valais on 7 November. For this year the drivers had to register for the championship, and the categories have been renamed into ERC 1 (for S2000, R5 and RRC (last year) cars), ERC 2 (category for R4 production cars (previously titled N4)) and ERC 3 (for R1, R2 and R3 cars).
Polish driver Kajetan Kajetanowicz won the championship.

Champions

1953 – 2012

2013 – present

Main categories

Other categories

Ladies champions

See also
 List of European Rally Championship drivers
 European Rally Trophy

References

External links
 Official website

 
FIA Zone rally championships
Recurring sporting events established in 1953